Eupithecia dzhirgatalensis is a moth in the family Geometridae. It is found in Tajikistan and Pakistan.

References

Moths described in 1988
dzhirgatalensis
Moths of Asia